Durcupan is a water-soluble epoxy resin produced by the Fluka subsidiary of Sigma-Aldrich.  It is commonly used for embedding
electron microscope samples in plastic so they may be sectioned (sliced thin) with a microtome and then imaged.

Durcupan is notable for refractive index nD20 of 1.654, which is a very high value for epoxy resins.

References

Electron microscopy
Synthetic resins